The 2004–05 FA Women's Premier League season was the 14th season of the FA Women's Premier League.

National Division
The season started on 15 August 2004 and ended on 7 May 2005. Arsenal were the defending champions, while Liverpool and Bristol City entered as the promoted teams from the 2003–04 Northern and Southern Divisions. Arsenal won their second consecutive league title, and seventh overall.

Table

Results

Top goalscorers
.

Northern Division
The season began on 15 August 2004 and ended on 2 May 2005.

Table

Top goalscorers
.

Southern Division
The season began on 15 August 2004 and ended on 24 April 2005. Cardiff City qualified for the European Cup by winning the Welsh Women's Cup.

Table

Top goalscorers
.

References

External links
RSSSF

Eng
FA Women's National League seasons
Wom
1